HMS Newcastle was a  light cruiser of the Royal Navy launched on 25 November 1909 from the yards of Armstrong Whitworth.  She formed part of the Bristol subgroup.

Service history
On the outbreak of the First World War she was stationed in the Far East on the China and Pacific station, being involved in operations during the Shanghai Rebellion in 1913, that had arisen as a result of the Xinhai Revolution that had broken out two years earlier.  When war broke out she bombarded Yap, prior to deploying to Valparaíso to search for the armed merchant raider . In late January 1916, Newcastle captured the German ship Mazatlan, which was then operating as the American ship Edna.  In 1917 she was reassigned to the East Indies and in 1918 she was again moved to operate off South America.

After an uneventful war service in comparison with her sisters, Newcastle was sold for scrapping on 9 May 1921 to the breaking firm of Thos. W. Ward. She arrived at the yards at Lelant on 3 May 1923 to be broken up.

Notes

References
 
 Jane's Fighting Ships of World War One (1919), Jane's Publishing Company
 Gray, Randal (ed), "Conway's All the World's Fighting Ships 1906-1921", (Conway Maritime Press, London, 1985),  
 Ships of the Bristol group
 Bristol cruisers

External links
 

 

Town-class cruisers (1910) of the Royal Navy
Ships built on the River Tyne
Ships built by Armstrong Whitworth
1909 ships
World War I cruisers of the United Kingdom